A Cape Islander, a style of fishing boat mostly used for lobster fishing, is an inshore motor fishing boat found across Atlantic Canada having a single keeled flat bottom at the stern and more rounded towards the bow. The Cape Island style boat is famous for its large step up to the bow. They are known for being good "sea" boats, and riding the swells well.

It originated on Cape Sable Island, Nova Scotia about 1905. (Various online sources cite years 1905, 1906, and 1907.) Two families claim credit for its invention. The design is most commonly credited to Ephraim Atkinson of Clark's Harbour, Nova Scotia. The Atkinson family builders have continued building pleasure and commercial boats to this day. The other claim to the boat's design is an accomplished boat-builder from Clark's Harbour, William A. Kenney, who is said to have constructed the first Cape Islander entirely from wood in 1905. The Cape Sable and Pubnico area of South West Nova Scotia remain major centres of Cape Islander construction for the Atlantic region using newer materials, larger sizes (notably an increased beam) and more advanced equipment. 

Beginning as an open motor-powered boat, Cape Islanders gradually evolved a covered wheelhouse called the "cuddy" which grew in size to provide bunks and a small galley space forward of the wheelhouse in the raised bow area.

This boat can now be seen in use all over coastal Nova Scotia, North America, and the world. It is closely related to the Maine lobster boat. Cape Island style fishing boats are also sometimes referred to as "Novi" boats. Slight regional variations include flared bow lines for Cape Islanders in the choppy Northumberland Strait area and smaller sizes in the Eastern Shore area.

References

 Small Wooden Boats of Atlantic Canada, by Wayne Barrett and David A. Walker (Nimbus Books, Halifax, 1990)

External links
Nova Scotia Motorized Fishing Boats by David A. Walker
Clark's Harbour article at The Canadian Encyclopedia

Types of fishing vessels
Water transport in Nova Scotia